The Ministry of Commerce and Industry - MOCI (Arabic: وزارة التجارة والصناعة), is responsible for the regulation of trade and industrial activities in Qatar. Its scope is to ensure fair trade and competition and restrict fraudulent and monopolistic activities. The vision of the ministry is to reach "a diversified economic landscape and self-reliant private sector within a competitive business environment aware of consumer rights as well as the responsibilities and obligations of the business community towards them." In February 2018, Ali bin Ahmad Al-Kuwari was appointed as minister. The current deputy is Sultan bin Rashid Al-Khatir.

Departments 
The ministry is divided into departments. Each is managed by an executive.

Minister 
 Minister Office
The Minister Office handles the schedule of the minister and organizes communication between the minister and other parties. It is tasked with ensuring the administration and implementation of the minister's orders.
 Internal Audit Department
The internal audit is responsible for the internal validity of the ministry by ensuring the legality of all procedures and conducts. It also oversees documentation and human resources.
 Public Relations and Communications Department
The department manages the public relations with the ministry. It provides information to the public and replies to inquiries. Statements and replies to the media are drafted in the department.

Deputy 
 Financial and Administrative Affairs
Responsible for the management of revenue, expenditures, and fees of the ministry, as well as documentation. It is in charge of managing and carrying out administrative proceedings.
Head: Nasser bin Muhammad Al-Muhannadi

 Human Resources
Responsible for providing adequate workforce to the ministry.
Head: Abdulrahman Mohsen Al-Yafei
 Information Technology Department
The IT department is responsible for providing and maintaining all the computer based systems of the ministry.
Head: Mashael Ali Al-Hammadi

Assistant Deputy of Consumer Affairs 
Departments under the assistant deputy of consumer affairs are mainly concerned with licensing permits and consumer protection from commercial fraud and monopolies.
 Quality license and market control
 Department of Supply and Strategic Inventory
 The Consumer Protection and Combating Commercial Fraud
 The Competition Protection Department

Assistant Deputy of Commerce Affairs 
 Intellectual Property Rights Protection Department
Departments under the commerce affairs are mainly responsible for matters relating to copyright and intellectual property
The following departments are also under the assistant deputy of commerce affairs:
 The Commercial Registration and Licenses Department
 Companies Affairs Department
Company formation in Qatar, the MCI requires a 51% local Qatari sponsor and mandatory office space with a flexi-desk as a minimum.

The MCI is dedicated towards companies requiring trading activities, office space availability anywhere in Qatar, specific business activities that require external approvals (such as taxi services, as an example), organizing of work with banking & government sectors etc.

References 

Government of Qatar